{{Infobox election
| election_name = 1976 United States House of Representatives elections in Texas
| country = Texas
| type = legislative
| ongoing = no
| previous_election = 1974 United States House of Representatives elections in Texas
| previous_year = 1974
| next_election = 1978 United States House of Representatives elections in Texas
| next_year = 1978
| seats_for_election = All 24 Texas seats to the United States House of Representatives
| election_date = November 2, 1976
| majority_seats = 
| turnout = 
| image1 = 
| leader1 = 
| party1 = Democratic Party (United States)
| leaders_seat1 = 
| last_election1 = 21
| seats_before1 = 20
| seats_needed1 = 
| seats1 = 22| seat_change1 =  2
| popular_vote1 = 2,368,543| percentage1 = 64.7%| swing1 =  7.6%
| image2 = 
| leader2 = 
| leader_since2 = 
| party2 = Republican Party (United States)
| leaders_seat2 = 
| last_election2 = 3
| seats_before2 = 4
| seats_needed2 = 
| seats2 = 2
| seat_change2 =  2
| popular_vote2 = 1,277,165
| percentage2 = 34.9%
| swing2 =  7.5%
| map_image = 1976 Texas US House.svg
| map_size = 
| map_alt = 
| map_caption = DemocraticRepublican}}

The 1976 United States House of Representatives elections in Texas''' occurred on November 2, 1976, to elect the members of the state of Texas's delegation to the United States House of Representatives. Texas had twenty-four seats in the House apportioned according to the 1970 United States Census.

Texas underwent mid-decade redistricting as a result of the U.S. Supreme Court case White v. Weiser. The court's modified districts were used in 1974. In 1975, the Texas Legislature modified the boundaries District 2 and District 6 to move the town of Streetman, which is on the border of Navarro County and Freestone County, fully within the boundaries of District 6.

These elections occurred simultaneously with the United States Senate elections of 1976, the United States House elections in other states, the presidential election, and various state and local elections.

Democrats maintained their majority of U.S. House seats from Texas, gaining two seats from the Republicans, increasing their majority to twenty-two out of twenty-four seats.

Overview

Congressional Districts

District 1 
Incumbent Democrat Wright Patman, the Dean of the House, died on March 7, 1976. This prompted a special election to be held, which was won by fellow Democrat Sam B. Hall.

District 2 
Incumbent Democrat Charlie Wilson ran for re-election.

District 3 
Incumbent Republican James M. Collins ran for re-election.

District 4 
Incumbent Democrat Ray Roberts ran for re-election.

District 5 
Incumbent Republican Alan Steelman retired to run for U.S. Senator.

District 6 
Incumbent Democrat Olin E. Teague ran for re-election.

District 7 
Incumbent Republican Bill Archer ran for re-election unopposed.

District 8 
Incumbent Democrat Bob Eckhardt ran for re-election.

District 9 
Incumbent Democrat Jack Brooks ran for re-election unopposed.

District 10 
Incumbent Democrat J. J. Pickle ran for re-election.

District 11 
Incumbent Democrat William R. Poage ran for re-election.

District 12 
Incumbent Democrat Jim Wright ran for re-election.

District 13 
Incumbent Democrat Jack Hightower ran for re-election.

District 14 
Incumbent Democrat John Andrew Young ran for re-election.

District 15 
Incumbent Democrat Kika de la Garza ran for re-election.

District 16 
Incumbent Democrat Richard Crawford White ran for re-election.

District 17 
Incumbent Democrat Omar Burleson ran for re-election unopposed.

District 18 
Incumbent Democrat Barbara Jordan ran for re-election.

District 19 
Incumbent Democrat George H. Mahon ran for re-election.

District 20 
Incumbent Democrat Henry B. González ran for re-election unopposed.

District 21 
Incumbent Democrat Bob Krueger ran for re-election.

District 22 
Incumbent Democrat Robert R. Casey resigned to become commissioner to the United States Maritime Commission. This prompted a special election to be held. Republican Ron Paul won the election in a runoff against former State Senator Robert Gammage, running primarily on Libertarian economic issues, flipping the district. He ran for re-election.

District 23 
Incumbent Democrat Abraham Kazen ran for re-election unopposed.

District 24 
Incumbent Democrat Dale Milford ran for re-election.

References

1976
Texas
United States House of Representatives